NGC 1820 (also known as ESO 85-SC39) is an open cluster in the Dorado constellation. It is located within the Large Magellanic Cloud. It has a magnitude of 9.0 and was discovered by John Herschel on 2 January 1837.

References

Dorado (constellation)
ESO objects
1820
Open clusters
Large Magellanic Cloud
Astronomical objects discovered in 1837